Henry William Braid (11 June 1917 – 11 October 2001) was an Australian politician.

Braid was born in Staverton, Tasmania; his cousin, Ian Braid, was also a politician. In 1972 he was elected to the Tasmanian Legislative Council as the independent member for Mersey. He was President of the Council from 1983 to 1984. He retired in 1990. His daughter was Sue Napier, state Liberal Party leader from 1999 to 2001.

References

1917 births
2001 deaths
Independent members of the Parliament of Tasmania
Members of the Tasmanian Legislative Council
Presidents of the Tasmanian Legislative Council
20th-century Australian politicians